Paul Marie Félix Jacques René Arnaud de Foïard (9 September 1921 – 7 August 2005) was a général of the French Army who served primarily in the French Foreign Legion taking part in World War II and the conflicts of Indochina and Algeria.

Military career 

Paul Arnaud de Foïard commenced his arms in the resistance where he was captured and interned on 4 December 1942 until 3 June 1943. Escaped, he disembarked in Spain where he was interned at Figueras. He was liberated at Setubal in Portugal, and embarked to Morocco on 21 August.

During this time, he registered an engagement for the duration of the war by joining the 501e Régiment de chars de combat 501e RCC. His services counted as retroactive, counting from 4 December 1942. He passed to the instruction depot of Dellys, then joined the school of Cherchell as an aspirant. He was assigned to the Marching Regiment of the Foreign Legion RMLE with the rank of aspirant on 1 April 1944. With his unit, he participated to the disembarking at Saint-Raphaël in September then to the offensive of the Ist Army, an offensive during which he was wounded by a mine. He was evacuated on 28 November 1944 and cited at the orders of the brigade with his first croix de guerre 1939–1945. It was at the head of his section, in Germany, that he was awarded the Médaille militaire in 1945.

On 8 February 1945 he was assigned to the 11th company of the RMLE. Leading a section (platoon), he distinguished leadership on 20 March 1945, at the crossroad south of Buchelberg; during the siege of Mulhausen, on 4 April, on the bridge of Enns, the 7; then in Herrenberg, the 18; at Hattingen, the 25; at Immendingen the 26; accordingly being awarded three citations at the orders of the armed forces and the Médaille militaire in one trimester. At the end of the war, he was sent to the École militaire interarmes, since September 1945, to validate his connaissances of an officer.

The RMLE was dissolved. Accordingly, Paul joined the 3rd Foreign Infantry Regiment 3e REI on 20 December 1945. A decree of February 1946 designated him as sous-lieutenant, to be effective starting 1 February 1944. He was then promoted to the rank of lieutenant on 1 February 1946.

He participated to the campaigns of Indochina, he disembarked at Saigon and joined the 11th company of the 3e REI on 11 June 1946. He was wounded by a machine gun, at My Duc Thay, on 22 January 1947. On 23 October 1947 he was assigned the company of camions bennes CCB. Accordingly, he was awarded a new citation at the orders of the armed forces and the knight croix of the Légion d’honneur, bestowed on 14 July 1947. This last one was matched with the croix de guerre des TOE, for his personal action in Cai Lay in Cochinchine; at Am Thai Dong in the province of Mytho.

During the creation of the Parachute Company of the 3rd Foreign Infantry Regiment, Co. Para du 3e REI, on 1 April 1948, he assumed the command of a platoon section under the order of lieutenant Jacques Morin. On 16 May he was awarded a citation at the orders of the division during a combat exchange battle at the fortified village of Tho Truong. Repatriated sanitary, he disembarked in Marseille, was hospitalized and benefitted of a break. He was assigned to the regional administrative company of Versailles.

Promoted to captain on 2 January 1952, he reassumed the service on 14 October 1952. He was entrusted with the command of the 2nd company of the 1st battalion of the 1st Foreign Infantry Regiment 1er REI on the 20. On 13 March 1953 he commanded the platoons of the 1e REI at Saida. In November he joined the moral service of the legion as editor-in-chief of Képi Blanc in Sidi Bel Abbès until dissolution in July 1955. He was then assigned in the qualities of a commandant of the 5th company of the 2nd battalion of the 4th Foreign Infantry Regiment 4e REI at Fes in Morocco. The  5e du 2/4e REI became the 6e CP du 4e REI, on 16 November 1956. At the corps of this unit, he partook to operations of maintaining order in the Rif and notably at Hibel, Tembouzid, and Zoua Ouah. He was cited at the orders of the division with croix de la Valeur militaire on 11 July 1956. He joined metropole in 1957 and was assigned to the depot of the legion.

Detached the provisionary commando group, in qualities of an instructor in garrison at El Hadjeb from 16 February to 4 July 1956, he was awarded a citation at the orders of the armed corps. Another citation at the orders of the armed corps, was conferred for another engagement. On 1 August 1957 he was assigned to the depot of the Legion in Marseille. He was promoted officer in the order of the Légion d’honneur on 18 December 1958. He joined the ESMIA de Coëtquidan groupment, on 1 June 1959.

He integrated the 74 promotion of the école supérieure de guerre in August 1960. Following, he was assigned to the operation means bureau of the 2nd Foreign Parachute Regiment 2e REP, on 1 July 1962. On 1 October 1963 he was assigned to EMAT bureau, where he was promoted to the rank of lieutenant-colonel, on 1 October 1964. Designated during his command time, he embarked to Mers el Kebir and became regimental commander of the 2e REP, on 1 June 1965 at Bou Sfer.

On 15 June 1967 the REP was repatriated on Corsica. With the finalization of this command tenure, he joined the EMA on 1 July. Accordingly, he was promoted to commander of the Légion d’honneur, on 14 July and to the rank of colonel, on 1 October. He was designated to serve at the 1st Parachute Brigade 1re BP and placed in subsistence at the 420th command and service battalion on 1 August 1972. The following January he was promoted to rank of brigadier general.

In August 1974 he was designated in a director quality, hors-cadre, of the Secrétariat général de la défense et de la sécurité nationale, under the orders of the Prime Minister of France and occupied the vice-presidency of the permanent council for military service in 1975. Reintegrated, he joined the 11th Parachute Division 11e DP and was division commander on 29 November 1975. He was promoted to division general, in December 1976.

Promoted to the rank and designation of a général de corps d’armée on 1 August 1979, he became director of the enseignement militaire supérieur of the French Army in October. On 17 September 1981 he was nominated as a grand officier de la Légion d’honneur. Attained by the reglementary age limit of his rank to the section of officer generals, on 10 September 1981.

Decorations

  Grand Officier of the Légion d'Honneur
  Commandeur of the Légion d'Honneur (1967)
  Officier of the Légion d'Honneur (1958)
  Chevalier of the Légion d'Honneur (1947)
  Médaille militaire (1945)
  Grand Croix of the Ordre national du Mérite (1966)
  Croix de guerre 1939-1945 (3 palms, 1 star)
  Croix de guerre des Théatres d'Opérations Exterieures
  Croix de la Valeur Militaire
  Médaille des Evades
  Croix du combattant volontaire (1939–1945) 
  Croix du combattant
  Médaille coloniale with agrafe (clasp) « E.O » 
  Knight of the Ordre des Palmes Académiques
  Médaille de la Jeunesse et des Sports
  Indochina Campaign commemorative medal 
  North Africa Security and Order Operations Commemorative Medal with agrafes (clasps) « Algérie » and « Maroc »  
  Bronze Star Medal, U.S. Army (U.S.)
  Officer of the Order of Ouissam Alaouite (Morocco)

He totalized 9 citations.

See also

Major (France)
French Foreign Legion Music Band (MLE)
Pierre Segretain
Pierre Jeanpierre
Helie de Saint Marc
Roger Faulques
Jacques Lefort, regimental commander 2nd Foreign Parachute Regiment 2e REP (1958)
Pierre Darmuzai, 2e REP (1960)
Saharan Méharistes Companies (méharistes sahariennes)
Jeannou Lacaze,  2e REP (1967)
Bernard Goupil, 2e REP (1972)
Jean Brette, 2e REP (1974)
Philippe Erulin, 2e REP (1976)
Jean Louis Roué, 2e REP (1978)
Bruno Dary, 2e REP (1994)
Benoît Puga, 2e REP (1996)

References

Sources 

 Képi blanc History and Patrimony Division of the French Foreign Legion

1921 births
2005 deaths
People from Meudon
French military personnel of World War II
French military personnel of the First Indochina War
French military personnel of the Algerian War
French generals
Soldiers of the French Foreign Legion
Officers of the French Foreign Legion
Grand Officiers of the Légion d'honneur
Grand Cross of the Ordre national du Mérite
Recipients of the Croix de Guerre 1939–1945 (France)
Recipients of the Croix de guerre des théâtres d'opérations extérieures
Recipients of the Cross for Military Valour
Chevaliers of the Ordre des Palmes Académiques